Costaconvexa centrostrigaria, the traveller or bent-line carpet, is a moth in the  family Geometridae. It is native to most of North America, except the Arctic. It is an introduced species in Great Britain, the Canary Islands, the Azores and Madeira.

The wingspan is 17–23 mm. The wings are pale gray to reddish brown. The antemedial and postmedial lines form dark brown bands. There is a small black discal spot on all wings. The species is sexually dimorphic. Males have mostly grey wings while females have a dark median area. Adults are on wing from May to October in Ontario, March to November in north-eastern North America and year-round in Texas and the west. There are two or more generations per year.

The larvae feed on Polygonum species.

References

External links
 
 Lepiforum.de

Xanthorhoini
Moths described in 1858
Moths of Europe
Moths of North America
Taxa named by Thomas Vernon Wollaston